Paramatta may refer to:

Paramatta, South Australia, a locality
Paramatta, an alternative spelling of the Parramatta suburb of Sydney, Australia
Paramatta (1803 ship), a schooner

See also
Parramatta (disambiguation)